Ectopsocus briggsi is a species of Psocoptera from the family Ectopsocidae family that can be found in Great Britain and Ireland. It is brownish-orange in colour.

Habitat
The species occurs on a range of trees and shrubs including:
Alder
Apple
Ash
Beech
Birch
Blackthorn
Bramble
Clematis
Horse chestnut
Lime
Mistletoe
Oak
Plum
Poplar
Sycamore
Sea-buckthorn
Sweet chestnut
Willow

They also occur in haystacks and leaf litter.

References

Ectopsocidae
Insects described in 1899
Psocoptera of Europe